Nasser Al-Kharafi (17 June 1943 – 17 April 2011) was a Kuwaiti businessman of M. A. Kharafi & Sons.

Life
His company has performed $4.3 billion in sales.  His net worth increased because of rising share prices of several holdings including Mobile Telecommunications Co., National Bank of Kuwait and Americana, operator of U.S. fast food chains. Al Kharafi was also linked to many other chains such as Pizza Hut, Kentucky Fried Chicken, TGI Friday's, Hardee's and others. He also held a major stake in one of the biggest telecom companies in the Middle East and Africa, Zain. His businesses spread from engineering, construction, maintenance to other services related to spheres as diverse as oil, water resources and management, chemicals, power and energy and food. Kharafi was not only working in Kuwait, but had extended his businesses to eleven countries. He had a keen interest in Egypt, where the Al Kharafi group built the port Ghalib International Marina.

Al-Kharafi had construction contracts in more than 30 countries worldwide. His net worth was $10.4 billion as of 2011 and he was considered the 77th richest man in the world.

In January 2009 he was linked to a takeover bid for Liverpool F.C.

Family
His older brother, Jassim, who attended Victoria College, Alexandria with him, was the speaker of the Kuwait parliament. His sister, Faiza, was rector of Kuwait University.

Death
On 17 April 2011, Al-Kharafi died from a cardiac arrest in a Cairo, Egypt, hotel room. He was mourned by relatives and close friends, Kuwaiti MPs, politicians and businessmen and international figures. After his death M. A. Kharafi & Sons was passed on to his three surviving brothers Fawzi, Jessaim and Muhannad.

See also
List of billionaires
List of Kuwaitis by net worth

References

External links
Profile on 2005 Forbes list
Profile on 2011 Forbes list

1943 births
2011 deaths
Kuwaiti businesspeople
Kuwaiti billionaires
Kuwaiti Sunni Muslims
Victoria College, Alexandria alumni
20th-century Kuwaiti businesspeople